The Sports Hub, Trivandrum, commonly known as Greenfield International Stadium, and formerly known as Trivandrum International Stadium, is a multi-purpose stadium in Kerala, used mainly for cricket. The stadium is located at Kariavattom in Thiruvananthapuram city, Kerala, India. It is India's first DBOT (design, build, operate and transfer) model outdoor stadium. The Greenfield Stadium became India's 50th international cricket venue on 7 November 2017 when it hosted  a T20I against New Zealand. On 1 November 2018, the venue hosted its first ODI. The Greenfield International Stadium is the main venue for the Kerala cricket team.

Facilities
The ground is designed such that it can be used for international cricket and football. The playing arena in the stadium has been constructed in line with FIFA regulations and International Cricket Council norms. It has a seating capacity for 55,000 spectators.

The stadium has been demarcated into four zones, where the north zone is dedicated to cricket, the east zone for football and each zone has a players’ lounge, gymnasium, media center, and stock room. Shopping malls and a food court are placed in the south zone. The adjoining Pavilion accommodates the latest facilities for squash, volleyball, basketball, table tennis, and an Olympic size swimming pool.

The first fully eco-friendly stadium in India, it is surrounded by green plants and also has a rainwater harvesting facility. The State Environment Impact Assessment Authority and Pollution Control Board have commended the builders for the green initiatives taken.

The stadium is 13.3 km from Trivandrum International Airport, 14.4 km from Trivandrum Central Railway Station, and Central Bus Station Thiruvananthapuram.

Construction details
It was the first stadium in India built on the DBOT (design, build, operate and transfer) basis. It is also the first stadium in the country to be developed on annuity mode. 
 The Greenfield stadium will be operated for 15 years by the company that built it. It will then be handed over to the University of Kerala, which has leased 36 acres for it. The university will receive Rs 94 lakhs per year as a lease.

Cricket 

On 27 May 2016, the Kerala Cricket Association (KCA) signed an agreement with Kariyavattom Sports Facilities Limited (KSFL) to take Greenfield Stadium on lease until 18 November 2027. According to the agreement, the KCA will be using the stadium for 180 days a year (from 1 October to 31 January and from 1 April to 30 May). However, the KCA can still hold cricket matches on other days if the stadium is available. The KCA will be held responsible for the maintenance of the playing area inside the stadium. The KCA will pay a fixed amount as fees and will share revenue with KSFL when international matches are held at the stadium. A joint committee consisting of six members, three each from KCA and KSFL, will manage and monitor the activities during the lease period. The KCA members in the committee will be its secretary and president.

Greenfield International Stadium Boundary Length 
There is not much playing surface at the Greenfield Stadium. The square boundaries are approximately 65 metres, while the straighter boundaries are approximately 70 metres. Even though the pitch is not very long, it will still be challenging for the batters since it is primarily a bowler's pitch.

Greenfield International Stadium Pitch Report 
The Greenfield International Stadium has proven to be a difficult pitch for batters, with bowlers having the upper hand. In the past year, South Africa and India had a T20I match there that was entirely bowler-centric. Subsequently, an OD between India and West Indies happened in 2018 where the latter were restricted to an embarrassing 104 runs. It is a track where pacers can capitalize on early swing, while spinners will have more success as the pitch matures.

International cricket matches hosted

1st ODI

On 1 November 2018, India played against West Indies in an ODI, the second international game to be played at the ground, with the home team winning by 9 wickets.

2nd ODI

On 15 January 2023, India played against Sri Lanka in an ODI, the second ODI game to be played at the ground, with the home team winning by 317 runs.

1st T20I

On 7 November 2017, India played a T20I against New Zealand on the ground. The match was reduced to 8 overs per side due to rain, with India winning by 6 runs.

2nd T20I

On 8 December 2019,  India played against West Indies in a T20I. The match was won by West Indies.

3rd T20I

On 28 September 2022,  India played against South Africa in a T20I. The match was won by India.

Greenfield International Stadium ODI records

Football 
The first international football tournament hosted by the stadium was the 2015 SAFF championship. India were crowned the champions, beating Afghanistan 2–1. The final recorded an attendance in excess of 48,500.

Semi-final

Final

Awards 
The Sports Hub, Trivandrum was adjudged as the winner of the David Vickers Award for New Venue of the Year, in the Stadium Business Awards 2016 held at the Santiago Bernabéu Stadium, Madrid, Spain on 1 June 2016.

See also
 List of association football stadiums by capacity

References

External links 

 Greenfield International Stadium ESPNCricinfo
 The Sports Hub Trivandrum official website 

Football venues in Kerala
Sports venues in Thiruvananthapuram
Cricket grounds in Kerala
2015 establishments in Kerala
Sports venues completed in 2015